ECISD may refer to:
Ector County Independent School District, a public school district based in Odessa, Texas
El Campo Independent School District, a public school district based in El Campo, Texas
Edinburg Consolidated Independent School District, a public school district based in Edinburg, Texas